Eugène Greau (29 May 1904 – 20 December 1943) was a French racing cyclist. He rode in the 1927 Tour de France. He died in the Sonnenburg concentration camp.

References

External links
 

1904 births
1943 deaths
French male cyclists
Sportspeople from Vendée
People who died in Sonnenburg concentration camp
French civilians killed in World War II
Cyclists from Pays de la Loire